The Central District of Hajjiabad County is a district (bakhsh) in Hajjiabad County, Hormozgan Province, Iran. At the 2006 census, its population was 52,816, in 11,112 families.  The District has one city: Hajjiabad. The District has two rural districts (dehestan): Dar Agah Rural District and Tarom Rural District.

References 

Districts of Hormozgan Province
Hajjiabad County